Jake William Hager (born March 4, 1993) is an American professional baseball shortstop in the Arizona Diamondbacks organization. He has previously played in Major League Baseball (MLB) for the New York Mets.

Career

Tampa Bay Rays
Hager attended Sierra Vista High School in Spring Valley, Nevada, where he was a four-year starter on the baseball team. As a senior, he was the Nevada Gatorade Baseball Player of the Year after batting .547 with 11 home runs and 57 RBIs. Hager was drafted by the Tampa Bay Rays in the first round (32nd overall) of the 2011 Major League Baseball draft. He signed with the Rays rather than play college baseball at Arizona State University. 

After signing, Hager made his professional debut that same year for Princeton Rays and spent the whole season there, batting .269 with four home runs and 17 RBIs in 47 games. He played for the Bowling Green Hot Rods in 2012 where he slashed .281/.345/.412 with ten home runs and 72 RBIS in 114 games, Charlotte Stone Crabs in 2013 where he batted .258 with 33 RBIs in 113 games, and Montgomery Biscuits in 2014 where he posted a .271 batting average with four home runs and 47 RBIs in 114 games. Hager did not play in 2015 due to injury. In 2016, he played for Montgomery and the Durham Bulls where he batted a combined a combined .233 with four home runs and 38 RBIs in 114 games, and in 2017, he returned to Durham where he slashed .229/.275/.328 with four home runs and 26 RBIs in 73 games. Hager elected free agency on November 6, 2017.

Milwaukee Brewers
On February 9, 2018, Hager signed with the St. Paul Saints of the American Association. 

On February 20, 2018, Hager signed a minor league contract with the Milwaukee Brewers. He was assigned to the Biloxi Shuckers. On October 29, Hager re-signed to a minor league contract that included an invitation to 2019 spring training. He elected free agency following the 2019 season.

New York Mets
On January 9, 2020, Hager signed a minor league deal the New York Mets organization. Hager did not play in a game in 2020 due to the cancellation of the minor league season because of the COVID-19 pandemic. He became a free agent on November 2. On November 4, 2020, Hager re-signed with the Mets on a new minor league contract. 

On May 15, 2021, Hager was selected to the Mets 40-man roster and was promoted to the major leagues for the first time. He made his MLB debut for the Mets that day against his former draft team the Tampa Bay Rays as a pinch hitter in the top of the 9th inning for Kevin Pillar, lining out to center field in his only at-bat. On May 21, Hager recorded his first major league hit, a single off of Miami Marlins reliever Adam Cimber. He was designated for assignment the next day after hitting .125 in 5 games.

Milwaukee Brewers (second stint)
On May 25, 2021, Hager was claimed off waivers by the Milwaukee Brewers. Hager posted a .211/.288/.394 slash line for the Triple-A Nashville Sounds before being designated for assignment on June 18. He did not make an MLB appearance with the Brewers before his designation.

Seattle Mariners
On June 22, 2021, Hager was claimed off waivers by the Seattle Mariners. Hager hit .214/.294/.469 with 6 home runs and 11 RBI in 26 games for the Triple-A Tacoma Rainiers before he was designated for assignment on July 27.

Arizona Diamondbacks
On July 30, 2021, Hager was claimed off of waivers by the Arizona Diamondbacks. Hager appeared in 9 games for the Diamondbacks, going 2-for-18 (.111) with 2 RBI. On September 12, Hager was outrighted off of the 40-man roster and assigned to the Triple-A Reno Aces. He became a free agent following the season, but re-signed on December 1. 

Hager was assigned to Triple-A Reno to begin the 2022 season. On May 16, 2022, Hager was selected to the active roster and started Game 1 of that day’s doubleheader against the Los Angeles Dodgers. In 28 games for Arizona, Hager batted .240/.345/.280 with no home runs and 3 RBI. He was designated for assignment on August 22, 2022. On October 2, Hager was re-selected to Arizona’s 40-man and active rosters, but did not make another appearance for the team to finish out the season.

On January 30, 2023, Hager re-signed with the Diamondbacks on a minor league contract.

References

External links

1993 births
Living people
People from Henderson, Nevada
Baseball players from Nevada
Major League Baseball infielders
New York Mets players
Arizona Diamondbacks players
Princeton Rays players
Bowling Green Hot Rods players
Gulf Coast Rays players
Charlotte Stone Crabs players
Montgomery Biscuits players
Durham Bulls players
Biloxi Shuckers players
Colorado Springs Sky Sox players
San Antonio Missions players
Syracuse Mets players
Nashville Sounds players
Tacoma Rainiers players